Joradighir Chowdhury Paribar is a 1998 Bengali film directed by Ajit Lahiri and produced by Sunil Ram.This film under the banner Shadow Productions.The film starring Soumitra Chatterjee, Madhabi Mukherjee, Asit Baran, Bhanu Bandyopadhyay, Tarun Kumar, Bikash Roy, Kali Banerjee, Nirmal Ghosh, Sabitri Chatterjee, Ruma Guha Thakurta in the lead roles.

Cast
 Soumitra Chatterjee
 Madhabi Mukherjee
 Asit Baran
 Bhanu Bandyopadhyay
 Tarun Kumar
 Bikash Roy
 Kali Banerjee
 Nirmal Ghosh
 Sabitri Chatterjee
 Ruma Guha Thakurta
 Shekhar Chattopadhyay
 Satya Bandyopadhyay
 Tarun Ray

Music
This film music composed by Kalipada Sen.

Awards
BFJA Awards (1967):-
 Best Actress Madhabi Mukherjee

References

External links
 
 Joradighir Chowdhury Paribar in Gomolo

Bengali-language Indian films
1966 films
1960s Bengali-language films